Craiglockhart Castle is a ruined tower house in the Craiglockhart district of Edinburgh, Scotland.

Background
It is situated in the Craiglockhart Campus of Edinburgh Napier University, to the north of Wester Craiglockhart Hill. Historic Scotland records that the tower was built by the Lockharts of Lee in the 15th century, although other sources state that it was the work of the Kincaid family during the 12th century. It was originally four storeys high, but now only the first and part of the second storey remain.

The ruin is protected as a scheduled monument.

References

Castles in Edinburgh
Scheduled Ancient Monuments in Edinburgh